The Epiphone Wilshire is a solid body electric guitar made by Epiphone from 1959 to 1970. It was positioned between the higher specification Crestwood and the lower specification Coronet. The Wilshire was reissued in two versions, the Wilshire II and Wilshire III, from 1982 to 1985. It was reissued again starting in 2009 and remains in the Epiphone catalog.

History
The Wilshire was introduced in 1959 as a symmetrical, double-cut, solid body guitar with a square-edged body and two P-90 pickups. For the 1963 model year, the guitar was substantially changed to an asymmetrical shape with rounded edges and two alnico mini-humbucker pickups. It remained largely in this configuration for the remainder of its production run. The Wilshire was reissued from 1982 to 1985 as the Wilshire II and Wilshire III. The Wilshire II had two mini-humbucker pickups and the Wilshire III had three. Epiphone once again reissued the Wilshire beginning in 2009. Several models were introduced: the limited edition Pro, '66 Worn (with or without "tremotone" (vibrato)) and '62 USA. In 2011, Epiphone released the Frank Iero signature Wilshire "Phant-o-Matic".

Reception
Doug Robertson of Premier Guitar praised the Wilshire, saying it was "perfect for old-school garage rock." He also stated that it "is the epitome of functional design. It’s simple, durable and versatile, yet it’s stylish enough to leap off an album cover." Robertson also noted: "This neck works great for power chords and tight rhythm jabs, but it may not be the most lead-player-friendly." In reviewing the '62 Wilshire for the September 2009 issue of Guitar Player magazine, it was noted that "this thing really rings out acoustically, with a bright snap to the notes that is underpinned by a rich, woody resonance."

Notable players
Bruce Springsteen

References

Wiltshire